The Chinese Manufacturers' Association of Hong Kong (CMA) is a not-for-profit chamber of commerce established on 1 September 1934 and one of the most representative industrial associations in Hong Kong. With over 3,000 member companies from various sectors of industry and trade. It was most well-known of its annual Hong Kong Brands & Products Expo. Since 1985, the CMA has representative in the Legislative Council of Hong Kong through the Industrial (Second) functional constituency.

Objectives
The CMA's primary objectives are:
 to promote Hong Kong's trade and industrial development;
 to represent industry in the formulation and implementation of Government policies;
 to participate in community development work; and
 to foster international understanding and co-operation.

References

Chambers of commerce in Hong Kong
1934 establishments in Hong Kong